"Tough" is a song by Scottish singer-songwriter Lewis Capaldi. It was released as a digital download on 8 June 2018 via Virgin Records as the lead single from his second extended play Breach. The song peaked at number 63 on the Scottish Singles Chart.

Track listing

Charts

Release history

References

2018 songs
2018 singles
Lewis Capaldi songs
Virgin Records singles